Cloverlea is a suburb of Palmerston North, New Zealand.  The suburb is located in the north-western part of town. It's boundaries are currently between Rangitikei Line and Gillespies Line. 

The suburb takes its name from the Cloverlea homestead and property built and developed by David Buick MP between 1881 and his death during the influenza pandemic of 1918.  Mr Buick ran a successful horse stud in addition to farming sheep and cattle at Cloverlea.  He was the Member of Parliament for Palmerston North from 1908 until his death in 1918.  Cloverlea is located at 102 No 1 Line, Palmerston North 4475.  

Under the Discharged Soldiers’ Settlement Act 1915 the government purchased  from the Buick estate and allocated 15 sections by ballot held 5 November 1919 to servicemen and nurses returning from the First World War.  The area was known as Cloverlea Soldier Settlement which over time contracted to Cloverlea.  However, the area to which this Cloverlea refers is not the more recent suburban development located north east of Highbury, north west of Palmerston North Hospital Area and north of Takaro, but an area about Cloverlea Road which serviced the settlement.

The Mangaone Stream walkway runs along the edge of Cloverlea, it starts all the way in Milson and ends by the Manawatu River.

In 2018, the suburb had a resident population of 1,893.

Cloverlea is a part of the Palmerston North electorate.

Demographics

There were 693 households. There were 906 males and 987 females, giving a sex ratio of 0.92 males per female. The median age was 34.2 years (compared with 37.4 years nationally), with 387 people (20.4%) aged under 15 years, 417 (22.0%) aged 15 to 29, 813 (42.9%) aged 30 to 64, and 276 (14.6%) aged 65 or older.

Ethnicities were 82.6% European/Pākehā, 23.1% Māori, 6.0% Pacific peoples, 4.3% Asian, and 3.0% other ethnicities (totals add to more than 100% since people could identify with multiple ethnicities).

The proportion of people born overseas was 11.6%, compared with 27.1% nationally.

Although some people objected to giving their religion, 53.2% had no religion, 33.8% were Christian, 0.6% were Hindu, 0.5% were Muslim, 0.2% were Buddhist and 3.3% had other religions.

Of those at least 15 years old, 210 (13.9%) people had a bachelor or higher degree, and 330 (21.9%) people had no formal qualifications. The median income was $32,300, compared with $31,800 nationally. The employment status of those at least 15 was that 819 (54.4%) people were employed full-time, 189 (12.5%) were part-time, and 66 (4.4%) were unemployed.

Education

References

Suburbs of Palmerston North
Populated places in Manawatū-Whanganui